The economy of the Rio de Janeiro City is the 2nd largest regional economy and financial center in Brazil, both one of the largest in Latin America and one of the fastest growing in the world.

In 2017, the city's GDP was estimated at US$105 billion (approximately R$407 billion), or 7% of the country's purchasing power parity (and the 75% of State of Rio de Janeiro's economy), making Rio de Janeiro the fourth richest city in Latin America, behind only Mexico City, Sao Paulo and Buenos Aires, as well as the 30th largest metropolitan area GDP in the world - ahead of cities such as Rome, Barcelona and Beijing. It is the center of Brazil's economy. 

==References==